Robert L. Freedman (born July 27, 1957) is an American screenwriter and dramatist. He is best known for his teleplays for Rodgers & Hammerstein's Cinderella (1997) and Life with Judy Garland: Me and My Shadows (2001), and for his Tony-winning book and lyrics of A Gentleman's Guide to Love and Murder (2014).

Early life and education
Freedman attended Los Alamitos High School, where he was the editor of the school’s newspaper. That’s where he met another influential figure in his life, a journalism teacher named Margaret Hall.

He attended the University of California, Los Angeles and New York University's Tisch School of the Arts. He holds Masters of Fine Arts from NYU in Dramatic Writing and Musical Theatre Writing.

Career
Freedman won the 1994 Writers Guild of America Award for Outstanding Television Children's Show for his script for the TV movie A Deadly Secret: The Robert Bierer Story (1993). He was the screenwriter for the TV movie Rodgers and Hammerstein's Cinderella (1997), and received a nomination for the Writers Guild of America Award for Outstanding Children's Script.

Freedman is the screenwriter and producer of the television movie Life with Judy Garland: Me and My Shadows, which was televised on ABC in 2001. The movie, about the early life of Judy Garland, was based on the book Me and My Shadows: A Family Memoir by Lorna Luft. Among other awards, Freedman was nominated by the Writers Guild of America, "Adapted Long Form". He was also nominated for the Primetime Emmy Award for Outstanding Writing For a Miniseries or a Movie, a Co-Nominee for the 2001 Primetime Emmy Award for Outstanding Miniseries.

He wrote the book for the stage musical Grand Duchy, with music by John Bayless, which had staged readings at Playwrights Horizons and the Paper Mill Playhouse and premiered in Santa Barbara, California, in 2003. A second performance, also in Santa Barbara, was expected spring of 2016.

He wrote the book to a musical titled Campaign of the Century, with lyrics by Freedman and Steven Lutvak and music by Lutvak. It is based on the book by Greg Mitchell, and is about the smear campaign against author Upton Sinclair. It had staged readings at the Chicago Humanities Festival in 2004, the New York Music Festival in September 2005, and the Beverly Hills Theatre Guild in 2006.

Freedman co-wrote a one-man play with Faye Greenberg titled The Beast of Broadway, which had its premiere in 2010 at TheatreZone, Naples, Florida. The play is based in part on the book The Abominable Showman by Howard Kissell, about the producer David Merrick.

Freedman wrote the book and lyrics to a musical version of Kind Hearts and Coronets, with music and lyrics by Steven Lutvak, directed by Ron Lagomarsino, which was presented at the Sundance Institute Theatre Laboratory, Utah, in July 2006. The musical had a staged reading in the Breaking Ground Series at the Huntington Theatre in Boston in April 2006. A Gentleman's Guide to Love and Murder, co-written with Lutvak and based on the 1907 novel Israel Rank by Roy Horniman (the source for Kind Hearts and Coronets), ultimately premiered in October 2012 at Hartford Stage in Hartford, Connecticut. The production, directed by Darko Tresnjak, transferred to the Old Globe Theatre in San Diego, California, in March 2013, and then opened on Broadway in 2014. Freedman won the Tony Award for Best Book of a Musical for this musical.

Work

Television
Sources: The New York Times, filmreference.com

The Royal Romance of Charles and Diana (1982) 
Broadway Sings: The Music of Jule Styne (1987) 
Taken Away (1989) 
Locked Up: A Mother's Rage (1991) 
Woman With A Past (1992)
A Deadly Secret: The Robert Bierer Story (1992) 
Honor Thy Mother (1992)
In the Best of Families: Marriage, Pride & Madness (1994)
What Love Sees (1996)
Mrs. Santa Claus (1997)
Unlikely Angel (1997)
Rodgers & Hammerstein's Cinderella (1997)
Long Way Home (1998)
What Makes a Family (2001)
Life with Judy Garland: Me and My Shadows (2001)
Murder in the Hamptons (2005)
The Pastor's Wife (2011)

Theatre
Grand Duchy (with John Bayless)
Campaign of the Century (with Steven Lutvak)
The Beast of Broadway: The Life and Times of David Merrick (with Faye Greenberg) (2010)
A Gentleman's Guide to Love and Murder (with Steven Lutvak)
Camp Rock: The Musical (with Faye Greenberg)

Honors and awards

References

External links
 Official site
 

1957 births
American lyricists
American musical theatre lyricists
Broadway composers and lyricists
20th-century American dramatists and playwrights
American television writers
American male television writers
People from Los Angeles
Writers from Los Angeles
Living people
University of California, Los Angeles alumni
Tisch School of the Arts alumni
Foreign Policy Research Institute
Tony Award winners